The men's doubles tournament at the 1988 Australian Open was held from 11 through 24 January 1988 on the outdoor hard courts at the Flinders Park in Melbourne, Australia. Rick Leach and Jim Pugh won the title, defeating Jeremy Bates and Peter Lundgren in the final.

Seeds

Draw

Finals

Top half

Section 1

Section 2

Bottom half

Section 3

Section 4

External links
 1988 Australian Open – Men's draws and results at the International Tennis Federation

Men's Doubles
Australian Open (tennis) by year – Men's doubles